"Slippin' Away" is a country music song written by singer-songwriter Bill Anderson, and made famous in 1973 by Jean Shepard.

Background
Her first single since signing with United Artists records in 1973. A mid-tempoed song in the Bakersfield tradition, it became Shepard's biggest hit in a decade (since 1964's "Second Fiddle (To An Old Guitar)" — and also her last top 10 hit.

Chart performance
"Slippin' Away" peaked at No. 4 on the Billboard Hot Country Singles chart in 1973 and marked at least the second time Shepard had a top 10 on the  chart hit with an Anderson-penned tune; she had hit No. 8 on the Hot Country Singles chart in early 1970 with "Then He Touched Me." Shepard went on to enjoy success with one other Anderson-written song: 1975's "The Tips of My Fingers."

References

1973 singles
Jean Shepard songs
Songs written by Bill Anderson (singer)
Song recordings produced by Larry Butler (producer)
1973 songs
United Artists Records singles